The Kenya Regiment was a unit of the British Army that recruited primarily from White Kenyans and some Ugandans with Black Kenyan recruits increasingly employed most notably, during the Mau Mau conflict. Formed in 1937, it was disbanded at the outbreak of World War II in 1939. It was reformed in 1950 and participated in the suppression of the Mau Mau uprising (1952–56) and was finally disbanded on Kenyan independence in May 1963.

History
The British colonial administrations in East Africa relied throughout their existence predominantly on military units recruited among Africans and commanded by Europeans. The various units were consolidated into the King's African Rifles in 1902. In 1907 the idea of a white settler defence force was discussed. The "Kenya Defence Force" was eventually established under the Defence Force Ordinance 1928. The Ordinance "made provision for the compulsory registration of all European males of British nationality in the Colony up to the age of fifty years and for their division into three classes according to age. However, those over fifty could also enrol in a fourth class." After questions were raised about control of weapons and potential settler threats to the Kenya Government in 1936, the Force was disbanded and replaced by the Kenya Regiment, formed 1 June 1937.

The Kenya Regiment was formed in the aftermath of the Abyssinia Crisis (1935). Fearing an Italian threat to the British colonies in East Africa, the Colonial Office ordered the reform of the military units in Kenya Colony. A section of the Territorial Army was established for white settlers to complement the long-established King's African Rifles (KAR) which comprised black soldiers under white officers. It was originally designated Kenya Regiment (Territorial Force) and subsequently expanded, also recruiting white settlers in Uganda Protectorate. At the outbreak of World War II in 1939, the unit's personnel were re-allocated to the KAR and Northern Rhodesia Regiment. Kenya Regiment soldiers also formed the basis for the creation of the Kenya Armoured Car Regiment.

The regiment was recalled in 1950 and participated in the suppression of the Mau Mau Uprising (1952–56), during which 31 of its members were killed. It was disbanded with the independence of Kenya in 1963.

Notable personnel
Roger Whittaker, singer and songwriter, national service, 1954–56.

Regimental Colours

References

Bibliography 
Guy Campbell The Charging Buffalo: A History of the Kenya Regiment 1937–1963 (London: Leo Cooper, 1986) 
Leonard Gill, Military Musings (Victoria, BC: Trafford, 2003)
Leonard Gill, More Military Musings (Victoria, BC: Trafford, 2004)
Leonard Gill, Remembering the Regiment (Victoria, BC: Trafford, 2004)
Ian Parker, The Last Colonial Regiment. History of Kenya Regiment (T.F.)

External links 
 Official website of the Kenya Regiment Association.

British colonial regiments
Military history of Kenya
Military units and formations established in 1937
Military units and formations disestablished in 1963
British Kenya
European Kenyan